Liviu Adrian Ganea (born 23 February 1988) is a Romanian professional footballer who played as a striker for Liga IV side Carmen București.

International career
Liviu Ganea played one friendly game at the Cyprus International Football Tournament for Romania, being used by coach Răzvan Lucescu to replace Sabrin Sburlea in the 68th minute of a 2–2 (2–4, after penalty kicks) loss against Ukraine.

Honours
Dinamo București
Liga I: 2006–07
Cupa României: 2011–12
Supercupa României: 2005
CFR Cluj
Liga I: 2011–12

References

External links

1988 births
Sportspeople from Brăila
Living people
Association football forwards
Romanian footballers
Romania international footballers
Liga I players
Liga II players
FC Dinamo București players
CS Otopeni players
FC Astra Giurgiu players
CFR Cluj players
CS Concordia Chiajna players
FC Brașov (1936) players
FC Politehnica Iași (2010) players
LPS HD Clinceni players
FC Carmen București players